Church on Sunday may refer to:

 "Church on Sunday", a 2016 song by Grace from FMA
 "Church on Sunday", a 2000 song by Green Day from Warning
 Church on Sunday, a 2019 album by Blac Youngsta